Adrian Yanez (born November 29, 1993) is an American mixed martial artist who competes in the Bantamweight division of the Ultimate Fighting Championship. As of March 7, 2023, he is #12 in the UFC bantamweight rankings.

Background
His father being a Golden Gloves winner, Yanez went into boxing from a young age, but later on took up BJJ. He started training MMA at the age of 15, having his first fight at the age of 17. Before the UFC, Yanez worked for the City of Deer Park as a Meter Reader. For most of his mixed martial arts career Yanez trained under late Saul Soliz in Houston, TX.

Mixed martial arts career

Early career
After finishing a successful 6-0 amateur career with four consecutive TKO’s, Yanez made his professional debut at just 20 years old, and ended with Yanez victorious by TKO in the third round. Suffering his first defeat against Levi Mowles in his very next bout, having no answer for the wrestling and ground and pound, he lost via unanimous decision. The Texan recovered with two victories in Fury FC, and then won his Bellator debut at Bellator 149 against Ryan Hollis via unanimous decision. Yanez then dropped a razor thin split decision to future UFC bantamweight Domingo Pilarte at LFA 7. Winning his next two bouts in the promotion, Yanez faced another current UFC fighter Miles Johns for the vacant LFA Bantamweight Champion at LFA 55. With history repeating itself, Yanez was on the wrong end of a close split decision loss. With two stoppage wins over Warren Stewart and Michael Rodriguez and then winning a split decision against Kyle Estrada at LFA 78, Yanzes was invited to Dana White's Contender Series 28, where he defeated Brady Huang in 39 seconds , earning a UFC contract in the process.

Ultimate Fighting Championship
Yanez was scheduled to make his UFC debut against Aaron Phillips on October 31, 2020 at UFC Fight Night: Hall vs. Silva. However on October 20, Phillips pulled out due to an undisclosed injury. Instead, Yanez faced promotional newcomer Victor Rodriguez. Yanez won the bout via head kick knockout in the first round. This win earned him Performance Fight of the Night award.

Yanez faced Gustavo Lopez on March 20, 2021 at UFC on ESPN: Brunson vs. Holland. He won the fight via walkoff knockout in round three. This win earned him the Performance of the Night award.

Yanez faced Randy Costa at UFC on ESPN: Sandhagen vs. Dillashaw on July 24, 2021. After getting dominated in the first round, Yanez rallied back in the second round winning by technical knockout. This fight earned him the Performance of the Night award.

As the first bout of his new four-fight contract, Yanez faced Davey Grant on November 20, 2021 at UFC Fight Night 198. He won the bout via split decision, although 12 of 12 media scores gave it to Yanez. The bout earned both fighters the Fight of the Night award.

Yanez faced Tony Kelley on June 18, 2022 at UFC on ESPN 37. At the weigh-ins on June 17, Kelley weighed in at 137.5 pounds, 1.5 pounds over the non-title bantamweight limit. As a result, the bout proceeded as a catchweight and Kelley forfeited 20% of his purse to Yanez. He won the bout in the first round via TKO stoppage. This win earned him his fourth Performance of the Night award.

Yanez is scheduled to face Rob Font on April 8, 2023 at UFC 287

Personal life
Yanez has a son (born 2021).

Championships and achievements 
Ultimate Fighting Championship
Performance of the Night (Four times) 
Fight of the Night (One Time)

Mixed martial arts record

|Win
|align=center|16–3
|Tony Kelley
|TKO (punches)
|UFC on ESPN: Kattar vs. Emmett
|
|align=center|1
|align=center|3:49
|Austin, Texas, United States
|
|-
|Win
|align=center|15–3
|Davey Grant
|Decision (split)
|UFC Fight Night: Vieira vs. Tate
|
|align=center|3
|align=center|5:00
|Las Vegas, Nevada, United States
|
|-
|Win
|align=center|14–3
|Randy Costa
|TKO (punches)
|UFC on ESPN: Sandhagen vs. Dillashaw
|
|align=center|2
|align=center|2:11
|Las Vegas, Nevada, United States
|
|-
|Win
|align=center|13–3
|Gustavo Lopez
|KO (punch)
|UFC on ESPN: Brunson vs. Holland
|
|align=center|3
|align=center|0:27	
|Las Vegas, Nevada, United States
|
|-
|Win
|align=center|12–3
|Victor Rodriguez
|KO (head kick)
|UFC Fight Night: Hall vs. Silva
|
|align=center|1
|align=center|2:46
|Las Vegas, Nevada, United States
|
|-
|Win
|align=center|11–3
|Brady Huang
|TKO (punches)
|Dana White's Contender Series 28
|
|align=center|1
|align=center|0:39
|Las Vegas, Nevada, United States
|
|-
|Win
|align=center|10–3
|Kyle Estrada
|Decision (split)
|LFA 78
|
|align=center|3
|align=center|5:00
|Belton, Texas, United States
|
|-
|Win
|align=center|9–3
|Michael Rodriguez
|TKO (punches)
|Fury FC 33
|
|align=center|1
|align=center|3:14
|Houston, Texas, United States
|
|-
|Win
|align=center|8–3
|Warren Stewart
|TKO (punches)
|Fury FC 29
|
|align=center|2
|align=center|1:46
|Humble, Texas, United States
|
|-
|Loss
|align=center|7–3
|Miles Johns
|Decision (split)
|LFA 55
|
|align=center|5
|align=center|5:00
|Dallas, Texas, United States
|
|-
|Win
|align=center|7–2
|Nathan Trepagnier
|KO (punch)
|LFA 35
|
|align=center|1
|align=center|4:56
|Houston, Texas, United States
|
|-
|Win
|align=center|6–2
|Trent Meaux
|Decision (unanimous)
|LFA 26
|
|align=center|3
|align=center|5:00
|Houston, Texas, United States
|
|-
|Loss
|align=center|5–2
|Domingo Pilarte
|Decision (split)
|LFA 7
|
|align=center|3
|align=center|5:00
|Houston, Texas, United States
|
|-
|Win
|align=center|5–1
|Colin Wright
|Submission (armbar)
|Legacy FC 59
|
|align=center|3
|align=center|2:44
|Houston, Texas, United States
|
|-
|Win
|align=center|4–1
|Ryan Hollis
|Decision (unanimous)
|Bellator 149
|
|align=center|3
|align=center|5:00
|Houston, Texas, United States
|
|-
|Win
|align=center|3–1
|D'Nearon Seymore
|Submission (triangle choke)
|Fury FC 7
|
|align=center|1
|align=center|1:31
|Humble, Texas, United States
|
|-
|Win
|align=center|2–1
|Jake Snyder
|TKO (punches)
|Fury FC 6
|
|align=center|2
|align=center|0:10
|Humble, Texas, United States
|
|-
|Loss
|align=center|1–1
|Levi Mowles
|Decision (unanimous)
|Legacy FC 37
|
|align=center|3
|align=center|5:00
|Houston, Texas, United States
|
|-
|Win
|align=center|1–0
|Richard Delfin
|TKO (punches)
|Texas City Throwdown
|
|align=center|3
|align=center|0:28
|Texas City, Texas, United States
|

See also 
 List of current UFC fighters
 List of male mixed martial artists

References

External links 
  
 

1993 births
Living people
American male mixed martial artists
Bantamweight mixed martial artists
Mixed martial artists utilizing Brazilian jiu-jitsu
Mixed martial artists from Texas
Ultimate Fighting Championship male fighters
American practitioners of Brazilian jiu-jitsu
People awarded a black belt in Brazilian jiu-jitsu
People from La Porte, Texas